Locroja District is one of ten districts of the Churcampa Province in Peru.

Geography
Other mountains are listed below:
 Allquchayuq
 Awqapa Tiyana
 Ichhu Urqu
 Llaqta Pata
 Yana Urqu

Ethnic groups
The people in the district are mainly Indigenous citizens of Quechua descent. Quechua is the language which the majority of the population (85.31%) learnt to speak in childhood, 14.57% of the residents started speaking using the Spanish language (2007 Peru Census).

References